George Henry Decker (February 16, 1902 – February 6, 1980) was a general in the United States Army, who served as Chief of Staff of the United States Army from 1960 to 1962.

Early life
Decker was born in Catskill, New York, and attended Lafayette College in Easton, Pennsylvania, receiving an economics degree in 1924. Afterwards he was a trustee of the college from 1964 to 1972. He married the former Helen E. Inman in 1926.

Military career
Decker was commissioned a second lieutenant of infantry in June 1924, and began his army service with the 26th Infantry Regiment, then stationed at Plattsburg Barracks in upstate New York. In 1928, he was sent to Hawaii, where he served with the 35th Infantry Regiment until 1931. He was promoted to first lieutenant in April 1930. After attending advanced infantry training at the Infantry School at Fort Benning in 1932, he remained at Fort Benning with the 29th Infantry Regiment until 1935, followed by service at Vancouver Barracks, near Portland, Oregon, with the 7th Infantry Regiment from 1935 to 1936 (during which time he was promoted to captain, in August 1935).

In 1936, Decker was sent to the Command and General Staff School at Fort Leavenworth, from which he graduated in 1937. Subsequently, he served with the 10th Infantry Regiment at Fort Thomas, Kentucky, and Fort McClellan, Alabama, and the 9th Infantry Regiment at Fort Bragg, North Carolina. In 1940 he took command of Headquarters Company, I Corps, at Fort Jackson, South Carolina, and was assistant supply and logistics officer, 1940–1941. In 1941 came a flurry of promotions: to temporary major (January), permanent major (June), and temporary lieutenant colonel (December). He was sent to Washington, D.C., to serve on the War Department General Staff, where he was assigned to the Office of the Assistant Chief of Staff for Supply. He was promoted to temporary colonel in October 1942 and became deputy chief of staff of the Third Army, Fort Sam Houston, Texas. He was then sent overseas to the Southwest Pacific, where he became deputy chief of staff and then chief of staff of the Sixth Army, a position he held through the end of World War II. He had been promoted to temporary brigadier general in August 1944 and major general in June 1945, and participated in Sixth Army operations in New Guinea, the Solomon Islands and the Philippines.

Decker returned to Washington in 1946 to Headquarters, Army Ground Forces and Headquarters, Army Service Forces, but soon went back to the Pacific as deputy commanding general and chief of staff of United States Forces, Middle Pacific, Hawaii, from 1946 to 1948.

Decker became commanding general of the 5th Infantry Division in 1948, and in 1950 was assigned to the Office of the Comptroller of the Army as Chief of the Budget Division. Promoted to temporary lieutenant general in 1952, he became Comptroller of the United States Army from 1952 to 1955. He was promoted to permanent brigadier general in April 1953 and permanent major general in July 1954. In 1955, he went to Germany as commanding general of VII Corps at Stuttgart, and was promoted to temporary general in May 1956.

From 1956 to 1957, Decker was deputy commander-in-chief of the United States European Command at its headquarters in Rocquencourt, outside Paris, France.  From 1957 to 1959 he was commander-in-chief, United Nations Command, and commanding general, United States Forces Korea and Eighth United States Army.

Decker was appointed Vice Chief of Staff of the United States Army in 1959 and on October 1, 1960, became Chief of Staff of the United States Army, serving in that capacity until September 30, 1962. Highlights of Decker's tenure were supervising augmentations to meet the crisis in Berlin (prompted by the construction of the Berlin Wall in 1961), increasing special warfare forces, initiating new divisional and forward depot concepts, and expanding the army to sixteen divisions. Decker retired at the end of his tenure.

Later life 
Following his retirement, Decker was president of the Manufacturing Chemists' Association in Washington for the next seven years. He died of leukemia at Walter Reed Army Medical Center on February 6, 1980.

Awards and decorations
  Army Distinguished Service Medal with one oak leaf cluster
  Silver Star
  Legion of Merit
  Bronze Star Medal
  American Defense Service Medal
  American Campaign Medal
  Asiatic-Pacific Campaign Medal with four campaign stars
  Army of Occupation Medal with "ASIA" clasp
  National Defense Service Medal with oak leaf cluster
 Distinguished Service Star (Philippines)
  Philippine Presidential Unit Citation
  Philippine Liberation Medal with three stars
  Philippine Independence Medal

Dates of rank

References

External links

|-

1902 births
1980 deaths
United States Army Infantry Branch personnel
Burials at Arlington National Cemetery
Recipients of the Distinguished Service Medal (US Army)
Recipients of the Silver Star
Recipients of the Legion of Merit
United States Army Chiefs of Staff
Lafayette College alumni
Lafayette College trustees
United States Army Vice Chiefs of Staff
Commanders, United States Forces Korea
United States Army generals of World War II
United States Army generals
United States Army Command and General Staff College alumni
20th-century American academics